"Sometimes We Cry" is a song written by Northern Irish singer-songwriter Van Morrison and included on his 1997 album, The Healing Game.  This version features the backing vocals of Brian Kennedy and Georgie Fame.

It has often been performed as a duet and a version with Morrison and Tom Jones was included on Jones' Reload album that was released in 1999 and charted at No. 1 on the UK charts in both 1999 and 2000.

Van Morrison's daughter Shana Morrison has often performed this as a duet with her father when she makes appearances at his concerts and also released it on her 1999 album, 7 Wishes.  On this album version, her father joins in at the end of the song with his harmonica playing and vocals on the last verse.  Shana said in an interview that she was surprised that her father agreed to over-dub his harmonica solo on the previously recorded studio song:

He usually does things live in one take and is opposed to any over-dubbing. It just came about all of a sudden. I asked him to do it, and he said yes. Maybe he was in a good mood that day.

Covers
Tom Jones with Van Morrison (Reload album, 1999)
Shana Morrison with Van Morrison
J. Michaels Band

Personnel
Van Morrison – vocals 
Georgie Fame – Hammond organ, backing vocals
Ronnie Johnson – electric guitar
Nicky Scott – electric bass guitar
Alec Dankworth – double bass
Leo Green – tenor saxophone
Ralph Salmins – percussion
Geoff Dunn – drums
Pee Wee Ellis – soprano saxophone, horn arrangements
Matt Holland – trumpet
Haji Akbar – flugelhorn
Robin Aspland – piano
Brian Kennedy – backing vocals

Notes

1997 songs
Van Morrison songs
Vocal collaborations
Tom Jones (singer) songs
Songs written by Van Morrison
Song recordings produced by Van Morrison